The 2021 Brighton bin strike was labour strike by bin workers in Brighton, East Sussex, England. The workers, represented by the GMB are striking in protest against low pay and changes of duties from the Brighton and Hove City Council. The strike was over by 20 October 2021.

Background 

Brighton and Hove had bin strikes in 2013 and 2014.

Strike 
With a 79.6% turnout, the vote among the workers was unanimous in favour of striking. The strike would last for two weeks, until 18 October. On 5 October, the strike began, with the GMB releasing a statement saying that "constant one-sided enforced driver removals, changes of duties, crew variations and alterations in plans around the collection of dropped work has had a detrimental impact on the HGV driver's health and well-being at the city's Hollingdean depot, and this very strong ballot outcome is a clear message to their employers that enough is enough."

On 6 October, the Labour councillors organised a meeting with the union. However, the union stated that  nothing concrete had been agreed upon. That day, the council also stated that they would not be able to hire temporary bin workers to replace the strikers, both for legal reasons and due to the ongoing shortage of large goods vehicle-qualified drivers.

On 8 October, the union served notice for an additional two weeks of strikes, to begin on 21 October.

On 11 October, negotiations between the workers and the council broke down, with the council accusing the union of walking on talks without hearing the full details of the proposed offer. The union, however, stated that the offer had been lower than the previous offer. Controversy erupted after Conservative councillor Joe Miller proclaimed that "I hate to refer to Maggie Thatcher, but this is a similar situation - you can't negotiate with terrorists." After council leader Phélim Mac Cafferty denounced the comment as unacceptable, Miller withdrew it, but did not make a formal apology.

On 12 October, the union announced that the strike action would be paused for three days, from 18 to 21 October, before resuming. That day, deputy council chair Jamie Lloyd released a statement calling the build-up of waste on city pavements "an appalling situation" and said that meeting the union's requests would lead to "catastrophic cuts in other services."

On 13 October, the city council decided to call in an independent mediator if negotiations broke down. The GMB stated that it would not continue negotiating until the workers received a formal apology from Miller for his comments. The BBC further reported that the council had estimated that a pay raise would cost from £0.5m to £14.2m, mostly due to council staff in other departments demanding a similar pay raise.

On 16 October, the union released a statement saying that "we had an agreement at 6:25 last night but the chief exec and his team have taken that away."

On 17 October, the city council announced that it had hired private waste collectors to pick up bins, citing safety concerns, both due to the piles of rubbish blocking pedestrian pavements and due to a number of fires in communal bins having been reported in the city in the previous days.

See also 
2022 Scotland bin strikes

References 

2021 labor disputes and strikes
Labour disputes in England
2021 in England
History of Brighton and Hove
2020s in East Sussex
October 2021 events in the United Kingdom